is a public aquarium located on the 5th and 6th floors of the Commercial complex "Tokyo Solamachi" in Tokyo Skytree of Sumida, Tokyo.

Exhibits

Sumida Aquarium was built in the Commercial complex "Tokyo Solamachi" in the Tokyo Skytree, and opened in 2012 at the same time as Tokyo Skytree. It is managed by ORIX Real Estate Corporation.

Due to the seawater purification system developed by Nagaoka University of Technology and Taisei Corporation, most of the tanks are operated only by artificial seawater.

The Ogasawara Sea tank at a depth of  has the motif of the sea of the Ogasawara Islands, and all the fish such as Sand Tiger Shark are wild individuals actually purchased from the Ogasawara Islands.

Spotted garden eel was brought in 634 after the height of Tokyo Sky Tree. After that, Gorgasia and Whitespotted garden eel were added.

Magellanic penguins inhabit about 50 birds.

Edo Rium is an Edo-themed goldfish exhibition zone. Renewed on July 1, 2016, 23 varieties of goldfish that have been loved since the Edo period are on display.

Gallery
Exterior

Fish tank

See also

 Tokyo Skytree
 Tokyo Skytree Station

References

External links
 Official Site 
 Official Site 

2012 establishments in Japan
Aquaria in Japan
Buildings and structures in Sumida, Tokyo
Amusement parks opened in 2012